The 2012 Liga Indonesia Second Division season (Indonesian: Divisi Dua Liga Indonesia 2012) is the seventeenth edition of Liga Indonesia Second Division. The competition is organized by the PSSI leadership under Djohar Arifin Husein. The competition called with name Liga Amatir Indonesia Second Division.

First stage

In this stage 100 clubs qualify/eligible to compete were divided into 20 groups. This stage started on 14 January 2012. Group Winner and runner-up qualify for 2nd round.

Second stage
In this stage 40 clubs qualify/eligible to compete were divided into 8 groups. This stage started on 28 March 2012 and ended on 3 June 2012.

Third stage
In this stage 16 clubs qualify/eligible to compete were divided into 4 groups. This stage started on 24 June 2012 and ended on 6 July 2012.

Round of 8
In this stage 8 clubs qualify/eligible to compete were divided into 2 groups. This stage started on 12 July 2012 and ended on 16 July 2012.

Grand final
In this stage 4 clubs qualify/eligible to compete were divided into 1 groups. This stage started on 23 to 25 October 2012.

All games held at the Tambun Stadium, Bekasi.

All times are West Indonesia Time (UTC+7).

Standings

Results

References

2012 Liga Amatir Indonesia Second Division
4